Tolype is a genus of moths in the family Lasiocampidae. The genus was erected by Jacob Hübner in 1820.

Tolype species

 Tolype abdan Schaus, 1924
 Tolype abstersa Felder, 1874
 Tolype adolla Dyar, 1911
 Tolype adventitia Draudt, 1927
 Tolype albiapicata Schaus, 1915
 Tolype albula Druce, 1897
 Tolype alegra Dognin, 1922
 Tolype aroana Schaus, 1906
 Tolype austella Franclemont, 1973
 Tolype biapicata Dognin, 1912
 Tolype bipunctata Giacomelli, 1911
 Tolype caieta Druce, 1897
 Tolype castralia Jones, 1912
 Tolype catharina Draudt, 1927
 Tolype celeste Dyar, 1911
 Tolype cinella Schaus, 1906
 Tolype columbiana Schaus, 1906
 Tolype cupriflua Draudt, 1927
 Tolype cydona Schaus, 1936
 Tolype damnata Schaus, 1936
 Tolype dayi Blackmore, 1921  (Day's lappet moth)
 Tolype denormata Draudt, 1927
 Tolype disciplaga Draudt, 1927
 Tolype distincta French, 1890
 Tolype dollia Dyar, 1911
 Tolype dulcis Draudt, 1927
 Tolype dyari Draudt, 1927
 Tolype effesa Draudt, 1927
 Tolype egena Draudt, 1927
 Tolype erisa Schaus, 1936
 Tolype fasciatus Druce, 1906
 Tolype ferrugo Draudt, 1927
 Tolype flexivia Dognin, 1916
 Tolype frenata Schaus, 1936
 Tolype fumosa Dognin, 1905
 Tolype gelima Schaus, 1906
 Tolype gelnwoodi Barnes, 1900
 Tolype glenwoodii 
 Tolype guentheri Berg, 1883
 Tolype hella Herrich-Schäffer, 1854
 Tolype incerta Dognin, 1905
 Tolype indecisa Walker, 1855
 Tolype innocens Burmeister, 1878
 Tolype intercalaris Draudt, 1927
 Tolype interstriata Dognin, 1912
 Tolype iridescens Walker, 1865
 Tolype janeirensis Schaus, 1936
 Tolype lanuginosa Schaus, 1896
 Tolype laricis (Fitch, 1856)  (larch tolype)
 Tolype lasthenioides Dognin, 1912
 Tolype lemoulti Schaus, 1910
 Tolype loisa Schaus, 1940
 Tolype lowriei Barnes & McDunnough, 1918
 Tolype magnidiscata Dognin, 1916
 Tolype marynita Schaus, 1936
 Tolype mayelisae Franclemont, 1973
 Tolype medialis Jones, 1912
 Tolype mediocris Draudt, 1927
 Tolype melascens Schaus, 1936
 Tolype meridensis Dognin, 1912
 Tolype minta Dyar, 1927  (southern tolype moth)
 Tolype miscella Dognin, 1916
 Tolype mollifacta Dyar, 1926
 Tolype mota Dyar, 1911
 Tolype nana Druce, 1887
 Tolype nebulosa Schaus, 1906
 Tolype nigra Dognin, 1916
 Tolype nigribarbata Dognin, 1912
 Tolype nigricaria Cassino, 1928
 Tolype nigripuncta Schaus, 1906
 Tolype notialis Franclemont, 1973  (small tolype)
 Tolype nuera Dognin, 1894
 Tolype obscura Dognin, 1923
 Tolype pauperata Burmeister, 1878
 Tolype pellita Draudt, 1927
 Tolype pelochroa Berg, 1883
 Tolype perplexa Schaus, 1912
 Tolype peruviana Dognin, 1916
 Tolype phyllus Druce, 1897
 Tolype picta Felder, 1874
 Tolype poggia Schaus, 1906
 Tolype praepoggia Dognin, 1916
 Tolype primitiva 
 Tolype pulla Draudt, 1927
 Tolype quiescens Schaus, 1936
 Tolype regina Dognin, 1912
 Tolype salvadora Dognin, 1912
 Tolype scaenica Draudt, 1927
 Tolype serralta Jones, 1912
 Tolype silveria Cramer, 1781
 Tolype simulans Walker, 1855
 Tolype songoaria Schaus, 1936
 Tolype sorex Draudt, 1927
 Tolype suffusa Jones, 1912
 Tolype tarudina Draudt, 1927
 Tolype tenebrosa Walker, 1855
 Tolype tolteca Neumoegen, 1892
 Tolype undulosa Walker, 1855
 Tolype velleda (Stoll, 1791)  (large tolype)
 Tolype ventriosa Draudt, 1927
 Tolype vespertilio Draudt, 1927
 Tolype villanea Dognin, 1897
 Tolype viuda Schaus, 1924

External links

Macromphaliinae